Taunton is a locality in the Eden Valley between Springton and Eden Valley in South Australia. It was originally created as a private subdivision of sections 560, 561, 568 and 569 in the Hundred of Jutland. The present boundaries were created for the long established name in May 2003. It now contains a few houses and a cemetery adjacent to Eden Valley Road / Route B10.

References

Towns in South Australia